Eugene David Pentz (born June 21, 1953) is a former Major League Baseball pitcher. He played all or part of four seasons in the majors, from  until  for the Detroit Tigers and Houston Astros. He was traded along with Leon Roberts, Terry Humphrey and Mark Lemongello from the Tigers to the Astros for Milt May, Dave Roberts and Jim Crawford on December 6, 1975.

References

External links

Major League Baseball pitchers
Detroit Tigers players
Houston Astros players
Bristol Tigers players
Lakeland Tigers players
Montgomery Rebels players
Evansville Triplets players
Charleston Charlies players
Portland Beavers players
Phoenix Giants players
Baseball players from Pennsylvania
1953 births
Living people
Sportspeople from Johnstown, Pennsylvania